Juha Yrjö Julius Tikka (30 December 1929 – 13 December 2001) was a Finnish swimmer. He competed in the men's 200 metre breaststroke at the 1952 Summer Olympics. He also was the commander of the Finnish Navy from 1983 to 1990. His rank was Counter admiral.

References

External links
 

1929 births
2001 deaths
Finnish male breaststroke swimmers
Olympic swimmers of Finland
Swimmers at the 1952 Summer Olympics
Swimmers from Helsinki
20th-century Finnish people